Pochuri, or Pochuri Naga, is a Naga language spoken in Nagaland, India.

According to Ethnologue, Pochuri is spoken in 27 villages of Meluri subdivision, Phek district, southeastern Nagaland. There are also some speakers in Ukhrul district, Manipur (Ethnologue).

Maluri (Meluri), which is often considered a dialect of Pochuri, may be a distinct language.

References

Languages of Nagaland
Angami–Pochuri languages
Endangered languages of India